The 1975 California Angels season involved the Angels finishing sixth in the American League West with a record of 72 wins and 89 losses.

California hit 55 home runs for the entire season. This caused Boston Red Sox pitcher Bill Lee to say about the team- "could take batting practice in a hotel lobby without damaging a chandelier."

Offseason 
 October 24, 1974: Paul Schaal was released by the Angels.
 January 9, 1975: Derek Botelho was drafted by the Angels in the 4th round of the 1975 Major League Baseball draft secondary phase, but did not sign.
 March 31, 1975: Horacio Piña was released by the Angels.

Regular season

Season standings

Record vs. opponents

Notable transactions 
 June 14, 1975: Denny Doyle was traded by the Angels to the Boston Red Sox for a player to be named later and cash. The Red Sox completed the deal by sending Chuck Ross (minors) to the Angels on March 5, 1976.
 September 12, 1975: Joe Pactwa was purchased by the Angels from the Alijadores de Tampico.
 September 17, 1975: Bobby Valentine and a player to be named later were traded by the Angels to the San Diego Padres for Gary Ross. The Angels completed the deal by sending Rudy Meoli to the Padres on November 4.

Draft picks 
 June 3, 1975: 1975 Major League Baseball draft
Danny Goodwin was drafted by the Angels in the 1st round (1st pick).
Paul Hartzell was drafted by the Angels in the 10th round.

Roster

Player stats

Batting

Starters by position 
Note: Pos = Position; G = Games played; AB = At bats; H = Hits; Avg. = Batting average; HR = Home runs; RBI = Runs batted in

Other batters 
Note: G = Games played; AB = At bats; H = Hits; Avg. = Batting average; HR = Home runs; RBI = Runs batted in

Pitching

Starting pitchers 
Note: G = Games pitched; IP = Innings pitched; W = Wins; L = Losses; ERA = Earned run average; SO = Strikeouts

Other pitchers 
Note: G = Games pitched; IP = Innings pitched; W = Wins; L = Losses; ERA = Earned run average; SO = Strikeouts

Relief pitchers 
Note: G = Games pitched; W = Wins; L = Losses; SV = Saves; ERA = Earned run average; SO = Strikeouts

Farm system

Notes

References 

1975 California Angels at Baseball-Reference
1975 California Angels at Baseball Almanac

Los Angeles Angels seasons
California Angels season
Los